Hasana-ye Hajjiabad-e Hajji Ebrahim (also Romanized as Ḩasanā-ye Ḩājjīābād-e Ḩājjī Ebrāhīm; also known as Ḩājjīābād-e Ḩājjī Ebrāhīm and Ḩasanā) is a village in Harirud Rural District, Bujgan District, Torbat-e Jam County, Razavi Khorasan Province, Iran. At the 2006 census, its population was 214, in 48 families.

References 

Populated places in Torbat-e Jam County